The Board of Governors of the Federal Reserve System, commonly known as the Federal Reserve Board, is the main governing body of the Federal Reserve System. It is charged with overseeing the Federal Reserve Banks and with helping implement the monetary policy of the United States. Governors are appointed by the president of the United States and confirmed by the Senate for staggered 14-year terms. It is headquartered in the Eccles Building on Constitution Avenue, N.W. in Washington, D.C.

Statutory description

By law, the appointments must yield a "fair representation of the financial, agricultural, industrial, and commercial interests and geographical divisions of the country". As stipulated in the Banking Act of 1935, the Chair and Vice Chair of the Board are two of seven members of the Board of Governors who are appointed by the President from among the sitting governors of the Federal Reserve Banks.

The terms of the seven members of the Board span multiple presidential and congressional terms. Once a member of the Board of Governors is appointed by the president, the members function mostly independently. Such independence is unanimously supported by major economists. The Board is required to make an annual report of operations to the Speaker of the House. It also supervises and regulates the operations of the Federal Reserve Banks, and the U.S. banking system in general. The Board obtains its funding from charges that it assesses on the Federal Reserve Banks, and not from the federal budget; however, since net earnings of the Federal Reserve Banks are ultimately remitted to the US Treasury, and spending by the Federal Reserve System reduces the size of these remittences, the effects of this source-of-funding distinction are largely optical.

Membership is by statute limited in term, and a member that has served for a full 14-year term is not eligible for reappointment. There are numerous occasions where an individual was appointed to serve the remainder of another member's uncompleted term, and has been reappointed to serve a full 14-year term. Since "upon the expiration of their terms of office, members of the Board shall continue to serve until their successors are appointed and have qualified", it is possible for a member to serve for significantly longer than a full term of 14 years. The law provides for the removal of a member of the Board by the President "for cause".

The Chair and Vice Chair of the Board of Governors are appointed by the President from among the sitting Governors. They both serve a four-year term and they can be renominated as many times as the President chooses, until their terms on the Board of Governors expire.

All seven board members of the Federal Reserve Board of Governors and five Federal Reserve Bank presidents direct the open market operations that sets U.S. monetary policy through their membership in the Federal Open Market Committee (FOMC).

Records of the Federal Reserve Board of Governors are found in the Record Group n. 82 at the National Archives and Records Administration.

Current members

The current members of the Board of Governors are as follows:

Vacancies and pending nominations

Committees
There are eight committees.

Committee on Board Affairs
Committee on Consumer and Community Affairs
Committee on Economic and Financial Monitoring and Research
Committee on Financial Stability
Committee on Federal Reserve Bank Affairs
Committee on Bank Supervision
Subcommittee on Smaller Regional and Community Banking
Committee on Payments, Clearing, and Settlement

List of governors

The following is a list of past and present members of the Board of Governors of the Federal Reserve System. A governor serves for a fourteen-year term after appointment and member who serves a full term may not be reappointed; when governor completes an unexpired portion of a term may be reappointed. Since the Federal Reserve was established in 1914, the following people have served as governor.

Status

Italics denotes date of term expiration

Succession of seats 
The Federal Reserve Board has seven seats subject to Senate confirmation, separate from a member's term as chair or vice chair.

Structure of leadership 
The Chair, Vice Chair and Vice Chair for Supervision are appointed by the President from among the sitting members of the Board to serve a four-year term and they can be renominated as many times as the President chooses, subject to Senate confirmation each time, until their terms on the Board of Governors expire.

Unsuccessful nominations 
The below were formally nominated to fill a vacant seat but failed to be confirmed by the Senate. In addition, Steve Moore and Herman Cain were announced, but never formally nominated, to fill Bloom Raskin and Yellen's seats (without specifying which seat or district) by Donald Trump in 2019 before being withdrawn from consideration.

References

External links

 Federal Reserve List of Governors
 Board of Governors of the Federal Reserve System in the Federal Register
 Nomination hearings for Chairmen and Members of the Board of Governors of the Federal Reserve System
 Public Statements of Federal Reserve Board Members and Chairmen
 Minutes of Meetings of the Board of Governors of the Federal Reserve System
 Works by the Board of Governors

1914 establishments in the United States
Financial regulatory authorities of the United States